Colonel Mohamed Abdul Salam Mahgoub (Muḥammad `Abdul-Salām al-Maḥgūb) (1935 – 31 January 2022) was an Egyptian politician. Through 2006 to his death, he was the Minister of Local Development in the Cabinet of Egypt. He was previously Governor of Alexandria Governorate, his term expiring upon his appointment to the Cabinet.

Mahgoub was born in Dakahlia Governorate in 1935. Prior to entering politics, Maghoub had been an officer of the Egyptian Army, having graduated from the Egyptian Military Academy in 1955 with a degree in military science. He was assigned as military attaché in several Egyptian embassies around the world prior to being appointed Vice-Chair of National Security in 1992. He subsequently served as Governor of Ismaïlia prior to being reassigned to Alexandria in 1997.

He was seeking election to the People's Assembly for the District of al-Raml in Alexandria. He sought to replace the retiring Sobhy Saleh Moussa Abu Amer.

Mahgoub died on 31 January 2022, at the age of 86.

See also
 Timeline of Alexandria, 1990s–2000s

References

1935 births
2022 deaths
Date of birth missing
Local Development ministers of Egypt
Egyptian Military Academy alumni
National Democratic Party (Egypt) politicians
People from Dakahlia Governorate
Governors of Alexandria